Ponto Org (English: dot org)  is a 2012 Brazilian independent drama film directed by Patrícia Moran.

Ponto Org follows Diamantino and Bárbara, who try to help three street boys of São Paulo. The film was shot in 2010 and despite being a fictional drama depicts the harsh reality of the homeless in a city like São Paulo.

References

Brazilian drama films
2012 drama films
Brazilian independent films
2012 independent films
2012 films
2010s Portuguese-language films